The emission spectrum of atomic hydrogen has been divided into a number of spectral series, with wavelengths given by the Rydberg formula. These observed spectral lines are due to the electron making transitions between two energy levels in an atom. The classification of the series by the Rydberg formula was important in the development of quantum mechanics. The spectral series are important in astronomical spectroscopy for detecting the presence of hydrogen and calculating red shifts.

Physics

A hydrogen atom consists of an electron orbiting its nucleus. The electromagnetic force between the electron and the nuclear proton leads to a set of quantum states for the electron, each with its own energy. These states were visualized by the Bohr model of the hydrogen atom as being distinct orbits around the nucleus. Each energy level, or electron shell, or orbit, is designated by an integer,  as shown in the figure. The Bohr model was later replaced by quantum mechanics in which the electron occupies an atomic orbital rather than an orbit, but the allowed energy levels of the hydrogen atom remained the same as in the earlier theory.

Spectral emission occurs when an electron transitions, or jumps, from a higher energy state to a lower energy state. The energy of an emitted photon corresponds to the energy difference between the two states. Because the energy of each state is fixed, the energy difference between them is fixed, and the transition will always produce a photon with the same energy.

Lines are named sequentially starting from the longest wavelength/lowest frequency of the series, using Greek letters within each series. For example, the  line is called "Lyman-alpha" (Ly-α), while the  line is called "Paschen-delta" (Pa-δ).

There are emission lines from hydrogen that fall outside of these series, such as the 21 cm line. These emission lines correspond to much rarer atomic events such as hyperfine transitions. The fine structure also results in single spectral lines appearing as two or more closely grouped thinner lines, due to relativistic corrections.

In quantum mechanical theory, the discrete spectrum of atomic emission was based on the Schrödinger equation, which is mainly devoted to the study of energy spectra of hydrogenlike atoms, whereas the time-dependent equivalent Heisenberg equation is convenient when studying an atom driven by an external electromagnetic wave.

In the processes of absorption or emission of photons by an atom, the conservation laws hold for the whole isolated system, such as an atom plus a photon. Therefore the motion of the electron in the process of photon absorption or emission is always accompanied by motion of the nucleus, and, because the mass of the nucleus is always finite, the energy spectra of hydrogen-like atoms must depend on the nuclear mass.

Rydberg formula

The energy differences between levels in the Bohr model, and hence the wavelengths of emitted or absorbed photons, is given by the Rydberg formula:

where

 is the atomic number,
  (often written ) is the principal quantum number of the lower energy level,
  (or ) is the principal quantum number of the upper energy level, and
  is the Rydberg constant.

This equation is valid for all hydrogen-like species, i.e. atoms having only a single electron, and the particular case of hydrogen spectral lines is given by Z=1.

Series

Lyman series ( = 1)

In the Bohr model, the Lyman series includes the lines emitted by transitions of the electron from an outer orbit of quantum number n > 1 to the 1st orbit of quantum number n' = 1.

The series is named after its discoverer, Theodore Lyman, who discovered the spectral lines from 1906–1914. All the wavelengths in the Lyman series are in the ultraviolet band.

Balmer series ( = 2)

The Balmer series includes the lines due to transitions from an outer orbit n > 2 to the orbit n' = 2.

Named after Johann Balmer, who discovered the Balmer formula, an empirical equation to predict the Balmer series, in 1885. Balmer lines are historically referred to as "H-alpha", "H-beta", "H-gamma" and so on, where H is the element hydrogen. Four of the Balmer lines are in the technically "visible" part of the spectrum, with wavelengths longer than 400 nm and shorter than 700 nm. Parts of the Balmer series can be seen in the solar spectrum. H-alpha is an important line used in astronomy to detect the presence of hydrogen.

Paschen series (Bohr series,  = 3)
Named after the German physicist Friedrich Paschen who first observed them in 1908. The Paschen lines all lie in the infrared band. This series overlaps with the next (Brackett) series, i.e. the shortest line in the Brackett series has a wavelength that falls among the Paschen series. All subsequent series overlap.

Brackett series ( = 4)
Named after the American physicist Frederick Sumner Brackett who first observed the spectral lines in 1922. The spectral lines of Brackett series lie in far infrared band.

Pfund series ( = 5)
Experimentally discovered in 1924 by August Herman Pfund.

Humphreys series ( = 6)
Discovered in 1953 by American physicist Curtis J. Humphreys.

Further series ( > 6)
Further series are unnamed, but follow the same pattern and equation as dictated by the Rydberg equation. Series are increasingly spread out and occur at increasing wavelengths. The lines are also increasingly faint, corresponding to increasingly rare atomic events. The seventh series of atomic hydrogen was first demonstrated experimentally at infrared wavelengths in 1972 by Peter Hansen and John Strong at the University of Massachusetts Amherst.

Extension to other systems 
The concepts of the Rydberg formula can be applied to any system with a single particle orbiting a nucleus, for example a He+ ion or a muonium exotic atom. The equation must be modified based on the system's Bohr radius; emissions will be of a similar character but at a different range of energies.  The Pickering–Fowler series was originally attributed to an unknown form of hydrogen with half-integer transition levels by both Pickering and Fowler, but Bohr correctly recognised them as spectral lines arising from the He+ nucleus.

All other atoms have at least two electrons in their neutral form and the interactions between these electrons makes analysis of the spectrum by such simple methods as described here impractical.  The deduction of the Rydberg formula was a major step in physics, but it was long before an extension to the spectra of other elements could be accomplished.

See also
 Astronomical spectroscopy
 The hydrogen line (21 cm)
 Lamb shift
 Moseley's law
 Quantum optics
 Theoretical and experimental justification for the Schrödinger equation

References

External links 

 Spectral series of hydrogen animation

Hydrogen physics
Emission spectroscopy
Hydrogen